Brenda Konar is a marine scientist, and professor at University of Alaska Fairbanks.

Education 
In 1991 Konar earned a master's degree from San Jose State University where she worked on Coralline algae. In 1998 Konar earned her Ph.D. from the  University of California, Santa Cruz where she worked on benthic communities in the Semichi Islands. 

In 2021, she was named Project Director of the “Fire & Ice” research project.

Research 
She studies the die-off in sea stars. She studies the decline in sea Otters, boom in sea urchins, and loss of Clathromorphum nereostratum, limestone reefs. She helped discover a new habitat of rhodolith.

Selected publications

References 

American oceanographers

University of Alaska Fairbanks faculty
American marine biologists
Living people
Year of birth missing (living people)
San Jose State University alumni
University of California, Santa Cruz alumni
Women marine biologists
Women oceanographers